Mark Brown may refer to:

Politics
 Mark Malloch Brown (born 1953), United Kingdom politician
 Mark Brown (Cook Islands), Cook Islands politician and Cabinet Minister
 Mark P. Brown (born c. 1950), former political candidate of the Democratic party

Sports
 Mark Brown (footballer, born 1981), Scottish football goalkeeper (Motherwell, Inverness, Celtic, Kilmarnock, Hibernian, Ross County)
 Mark Brown (footballer, born 1984), Scottish football player (Alloa Athletic)
 Mark Brown (golfer) (born 1975), New Zealand golfer
 Mark Brown (linebacker, born 1961), American football linebacker for the Miami Dolphins and Detroit Lions 
 Mark Brown (linebacker, born 1980), American football linebacker for the New York Jets and Arizona Cardinals
 Mark Brown (cricketer) (born 1958), Welsh cricketer
 Mark Brown (baseball) (born 1959), American former professional baseball pitcher
 Mark Brown (athlete) (born 1962 or 1963), Paralympic athlete from Great Britain and Gibraltar
 Mark Brown (rugby union) (born 1958), Welsh rugby union player

Other uses
 Mark Henry Brown (1911–1941), Canadian fighter ace during World War II
 Mark A. Brown (born 1961), American businessman and gaming industry executive
 Mark E. Brown (born 1962), American businessman
 Mark N. Brown (born 1951), NASA astronaut
 Mark Brown (conductor), British choral conductor, see Pro Cantione Antiqua
 Mark Brown, saxophonist and member of The Horne Section
 Mark Brown, creator of Game Maker's Toolkit and video game journalist
 Brownmark (born 1962), bassist for Prince's band the Revolution

See also
 Marc Brown (disambiguation)
 Mark Browne (disambiguation)